Jang Jin (born February 24, 1971) is a South Korean film director, theatre director, playwright, screenwriter, film producer, actor and TV personality.

Considered one of the most distinctive voices to emerge from the 1990s Korean cinema renaissance, Jang's unique filmmaking style mixes unconventional storylines, quirky characters, dry and subversive humor, comic twists, sharp puns, stagy presentation, a keen observation of society, and humanism. Jang’s films do not sell millions of tickets but he has nurtured a faithful fan base that appreciates his "Jang Jin-ish" style.

Career
Jang Jin dreamed of becoming a musician in middle school, but his ambition changed when he saw his first theater play in his freshman year of high school. As a high school student, he acted in more than 40 plays, receiving good reviews and a few awards for his performances. After majoring in theater studies at Seoul Institute of the Arts, he joined the writing team for the SBS variety show Good Friends in the mid 1990s. He created his own portion Hollywood Message, which he wrote and edited by himself, where he would take famous scenes from some of the most popular Hollywood films showing in theaters, and make parodies, add silly popups, mix scenes from different films together to form a bizarre, unique collage of images. Because of his contribution, ratings for the show surged to unexpected heights.

In January 1995, Jang entered newspaper daily The Chosun Ilbo's annual literary contest with Cheonho-dong Crossroad, his first full-fledged script. Using three characters which would feature in most of his theater plays and early films (Hwa-yi, Dal-soo and Deok-bae), his new and creative brand of storytelling won over the judges, who awarded him the top prize. He wrote his first stage play Heotang ("labor in vain") at the age of 21 while serving his military duty, and his followup Clumsy People, not only granted him much praise, but was also a big success, and allowed actress Song Chae-hwan to win the Best Actress Award at the Seoul Theater Festival. At the same time, he was helping adapt Song Jae-hee's original into what became A Hot Roof, a feminist comedy where a group of women from all walks of life protest their position in society from the roof of a building, while their husbands and the rest of the city try to cope with all that in the midst of one of the hottest summers Korea had ever seen.

It would take another few years before Jang could start working full-time in Chungmuro, but during that time, he built a reputation as one of the most brilliant theater directors in the country, with unique scripts and characters who came across as real even in the most surreal of situations. His 1997 play Taxi Driver was a huge success, displaying his wit and talent for snappy dialogue. The original starred Choi Min-sik as Deok-bae, a taxi driver from the countryside who decides to come to the city, buys a private taxi after his mother sold some land, and hopes to finally make a change in his miserable life.

The success of his theater plays raised his profile in the industry. Veteran TV drama director Kim Jong-hak commissioned Jang for a script, but the project was delayed. Jang decided to shop around his script, which led to his debut feature 1998 comedy The Happenings (though only half of what he shot ended up in the final cut).

In 1999 Jang founded the theater troupe Suda, and among his regulars were Jung Gyu-soo, Shin Ha-kyun, Jung Jae-young and Jang Young-nam. After working on the play Magic Time, he then shot his second film The Spy, a comedy starring Yoo Oh-sung as a North Korean spy trying to steal the magic formula of the South's "super pig" to combat the famine.

The rest of Jang's career brought him to the top of Korea's A-list directors, with the same brand of "Jang Jin style" crowd pleasers, such as Guns & Talks, a black comedy about four talkative assassins. In 2000 Jang established his own film production outfit Film It Suda, hiring his "family" of fellow writers, producers and directors. Their first production was the three-part omnibus No Comment in 2002.

With his theater and film successes, Jang was finally able to move on to producing and his real passion, writing. But the huge flop of the 2003 melodrama A Man Who Went to Mars (also known as A Letter from Mars, which Jang wrote) brought the company's future to a serious crossroad: either focus on hot items or risk losing everything. Though the aftermath of the film's failure was felt even in 2004, romantic comedy Someone Special had a decent box office performance despite the film's low budget, as well as glowing reviews for its stars Lee Na-young and Jung Jae-young. Jang then focused on adapting his successful 2000 theater play Leave When They're Applauding into the big screen. The result was 2005's Murder, Take One, about a homicide case being broadcast live for 48 hours, a whodunit with a campy take on the ratings-obsessed media and the viewers' craze for reality TV.

But it would be another of the company's films that became one of the biggest critical and commercial successes of 2005. Adapted by Jang from his same-titled 2002 play, Welcome to Dongmakgol is the story of a remote mountain village where North and South Korean soldiers as well as an American soldier are stranded during the Korean War. The fantasy dramedy was the debut feature of Park Kwang-hyun, one of several of Jang's colleagues from his theater days who joined Film It Suda.

In August 2005 Jang served as theatre director for the first time on a play he didn't write himself. He directed his fellow Seoul Institute of the Arts alumni in a staging of Arthur Miller's Death of a Salesman. The play commemorated the 43rd anniversary for Dongnang Arts Center affiliated to the institute and the 100th birthday of the late Yu Chi-jin, founder of the institute and the nation's first amphitheater.

After his doing his takes on the gangster genre (2006's Righteous Ties) and the melodrama genre (2007's father-centered My Son), Jang wrote the witty script for Ra Hee-chan's Going by the Book, about a mock bank robbery drill that turns embarrassingly real. He also injected an enhanced comic effect into the screenplay of Public Enemy Returns, the third installment in Kang Woo-suk's series on tough detective Kang Cheol-jung (played by Sol Kyung-gu).

His feel-good political satire Good Morning President was the opening film of the 2009 Busan International Film Festival. At the MBC Drama Awards that year, Jang won a Special Award for his 2008 radio show segment Radio Book Club on MBC Standard FM.

His next films, 2010 ensemble comedy The Quiz Show Scandal and 2011 melodrama Romantic Heaven, though well-reviewed, were less successful at the box office.

Besides being the CEO of Film It Suda, he is also co-founder of the film production company KnJ Entertainment Inc. alongside friend Kang Woo-suk.

Jang was a judge on the first and second seasons of Korea's Got Talent. He wrote and directed the first three seasons of sketch comedy show Saturday Night Live Korea and anchored SNL Korea's version of Weekend Update. Jang says he believes satirical comedies can change society for the better.

Personal life
Jang was back from his military enlistment in Winter 1993.

In May 2007, he married then-grad student Cha Young-eun. They have two sons, Jang Cha-in and Jang Cha-yoon.

Filmography

Short film

Film

Television

Theater

Awards

Notes

References

External links
 
 Jang Jin at Cine21 
 
 
  
 Jang Jin at Daum Encyclopedia 
 Jang Jin at Daum Movie 
 Jang Jin at Naver 

South Korean film directors
South Korean male film actors
South Korean screenwriters
Seoul Institute of the Arts alumni
Male actors from Seoul
Living people
1971 births